King & Prince is the debut studio album from Japanese pop group King & Prince, released on June 19, 2019 by Johnny's Universe. It was the group's first full release following the merging of the two individual units, Mr. King and Mr. Prince.

Background and release 
King & Prince's debut studio album was announced on May 17, 2019, alongside a full track listing, product details and its official release date. The album features three previously released singles; "Cinderella Girl," "Memorial," and "Kimi no Matteru." 

The album was released physically on June 19, 2019, in three different versions. The Standard Edition, originally priced at ¥3000, featured a poster as well as bonus track "King & Prince, Queen & Princess." Limited Edition A included an exclusive bonus DVD, featuring three different music videos for the track "Naughty Girl;" the original music video, the Solo Member version, and a dance practise version. The DVD also included a behind-the-scenes video for the filming of the music videos, and a video were members discussed their thoughts and future plans with the group. Limited Edition B included an exclusive bonus CD, which featured both tracks made under their former alias Mr. King vs. Mr. Prince, three tracks from their individual sub-units Mr. King and Mr. Prince, as well as three new bonus tracks titled "Hello!!" "Katsunda WIN!" and "MIXTURE." Both Limited Editions were originally priced at ¥3600.

It was the final release from the group to feature vocals from Genki Iwahashi, being released seven months into his hiatus. He eventually departed from the group in 2021 after more than two years of inactivity.

Commercial performance 
King & Prince debuted at number one on Oricon's Singles Chart for the week ending June 23, 2019. The album spent a total of 133 weeks on the chart, making it their longest charting album. The album placed at number two on Oricon's annual album chart for the year of 2019, ranking behind only 5x20 All the Best!! 1999–2019 by Arashi. The album has also sold over 600,000 copies, and was verified as double platinum by the Recording Industry Association of Japan in June 2019.

Track listing 
Tracks 6, 7, and 8 on CD2 are performed by only Sho Hirano, Ren Nagase, and Kaito Takahashi, under the alias Mr. King.

Tracks 9, 10, and 11 on CD2 are performed by only Yuta Kishi, Yuta Jinguji, and  Genki Iwahashi, under the alias Prince.

Charts

Weekly Charts

Yearly Charts

Awards and nominations

References 

Japanese-language albums
2019 debut albums